Corinne  Bohrer (born October 18, 1958) is an American film and television actress whose career has continued uninterrupted for four decades and includes regular roles in eight primetime series produced between 1984 and 2015: E/R (1984–85), Free Spirit (leading role, 1989–90), Man of the People (1991–92), Double Rush (1995), Partners (1995–96), Rude Awakening (recurring, 1998–2001), Veronica Mars (recurring, 2004–2006) and Murder in the First (recurring, 2015).

Early life
Born on the North Carolina Marine Corps Base Camp Lejeune, Bohrer was raised in Lancaster, Pennsylvania; Billings, Montana; and Arlington, Texas, where she attended Lamar High School. She was active in drama, band, and student government. 

During the summer of 1976 she worked at Six Flags over Texas as a carnival barker in Skeeball Palace in the Games Department. 

She attended The University of Texas at Arlington to study journalism but never graduated.

Career
While in college, she modeled, performed in commercials and worked as a dancer.

Television work
By the time of her 22nd birthday, Bohrer was in Hollywood, working on her first on-screen assignment — a one-minute role as stranded motorist Vicki Thomas asking for help from the younger of the two leading men on McClain's Law, the pilot telefilm of the 1981 James Arness same-named police series. In 1986 she appeared in the 22nd episode of the first season of MacGyver as Terry Ross. In 1988 she co-starred opposite Randy Quaid in Dead Solid Perfect, where she filmed her only nude scene, and followed that with a co-starring role opposite Judge Reinhold and Fred Savage in the comedy Vice Versa.

During the 1990s she appeared on Murder, She Wrote. Previous roles were more comedic, including her role as a pediatric nurse who had a crush on Elliott Gould in the short-lived CBS situation comedy E/R, a witch in the similarly brief sitcom Free Spirit, an administrative assistant to a City Councilman in fictitious Long View, California, played by James Garner in the quickly-cancelled NBC sitcom Man of the People, and in Phantom of the Megaplex (2000). She is also known as Trickster's sidekick Prank in the 1990 CBS series The Flash and the version from The CW, in which she appeared in a 2018 episode.

Bohrer's work has included a recurring role as Lianne Mars, the wayward mother of the title character in the CW television series Veronica Mars.

She was featured in the Dream On episode "What I Did for Lust" and the Friends episode "The One Where Rachel Finds Out" (1995).

Commercial work
Over the years, Bohrer has also frequently appeared in commercials. Bohrer appeared in McDonald's 1987 Chicken McNuggets Shanghai campaign. She also played the role of the "counselor" in Apple Inc.'s "Get a Mac" ad campaign.  Other commercials include Totinos Pizza Rolls, Walgreens, Campbell's low sodium soup and Bounty ("One-sheeter"!).

Filmography

Film

Television

References

External links

American television actresses
American film actresses
1958 births
20th-century American actresses
21st-century American actresses
Living people
People from Arlington, Texas
Actresses from Texas
People from Camp Lejeune, North Carolina